is a Japanese softball player who won a bronze medal in the 2004 Summer Olympics.

External links
 
 

1979 births
Japanese softball players
Living people
Olympic softball players of Japan
Olympic bronze medalists for Japan
Softball players at the 2004 Summer Olympics
Olympic medalists in softball
Asian Games medalists in softball
Medalists at the 2004 Summer Olympics
Softball players at the 2002 Asian Games
Sportspeople from Saitama (city)
Medalists at the 2002 Asian Games
Asian Games gold medalists for Japan
21st-century Japanese women